This is a list of ambassadors of the United States to Cambodia.

Until 1953 Cambodia had been French protectorate as a part of French Indochina, but became independent on November 9, 1953. The United States had appointed its first envoy to Cambodia, Donald R. Heath, in 1950. Heath was a non-resident minister who was commissioned to Cambodia, Laos, and Vietnam, while resident in Saigon.

Diplomatic relations between Cambodia and the United States were broken twice: The first time between 1965 and 1969, and the second time in 1975 just before the Pol Pot regime gained control of the country. Relations were finally restored in 1991.

The U.S. Embassy in Cambodia is located in Phnom Penh.

Ambassadors

Source: List of U.S. Ambassadors to Cambodia

Notes

See also
Cambodia – United States relations
Foreign relations of Cambodia
Ambassadors of the United States

References
United States Department of State: Background notes on Cambodia

External links
 United States Department of State: Chiefs of Mission for Cambodia
 United States Department of State: Cambodia
 United States Embassy in Cambodia

Cambodia
 
United States
1950 establishments in Cambodia